Saparbay (also as Sepabayi) is a township of Akqi County in Xinjiang Uygur Autonomous Region, China. Located in the east of the county, it covers an area of 2,066 kilometres with a population of 3,004 (2010 Census), the main ethnic group is Kyrgyz. The township has 3 administrative villages (as of 2018) and 7 unincorporated villages under jurisdiction, its seat is at Saparbay Village.

The name of "Saparbay" was from the Kyrgyz language, meaning "traffic main artery". The township is located in the east of the county, 25 kilometers east of the county seat Akqi Town.

History
It was formerly part of the 1st district in 1950 and part of the Hulangshan Commune in 1958, Saparbay Commune was established in 1962, it was renamed to Dongfanghong Commune in 1969 and  back to the name of Saparbay Commune in 1978, the commune was re-organized as a township in 1984.

Administrative divisions
 Akoy Village
 Karabulung Village 
 Saparbay Village

Overview
The township is located in the east of the county. agriculture and Animal husbandry are the main industries. The main crops are wheat, corn, vicia faba, sesame and rape. The provincial road S306 passes through the township.

References 

Township-level divisions of Akqi County